Marc Deschenes (born 1 January 1993) is a Canadian judoka.

He is the bronze medallist of the 2021 Judo Grand Slam Abu Dhabi in the +100 kg category.

References

External links
 
 

1993 births
Living people
Canadian male judoka
Pan American Games medalists in judo
Pan American Games silver medalists for Canada
Judoka at the 2015 Pan American Games
Medalists at the 2015 Pan American Games
Judoka at the 2022 Commonwealth Games
Commonwealth Games gold medallists for Canada
Medallists at the 2022 Commonwealth Games